The 1900 Penn Quakers football team represented the University of Pennsylvania in the 1900 college football season. The Quakers finished with a 12–1 record in their ninth year under head coach and College Football Hall of Fame inductee, George Washington Woodruff. Significant games included victories over Penn State (17–5), Chicago (41–0), Carlisle (16–6), and Navy (28–6), and a loss to Harvard (17–5).  The 1900 Penn team outscored its opponents by a combined total of 335 to 45. Four Penn players received recognition on the 1900 College Football All-America Team: guard Truxtun Hare (consensus 1st-team All-American); tackle Blondy Wallace (Walter Camp, 2nd team); guard John Teas (Camp, 3rd team); and fullback Josiah McCracken (Camp, 3rd team).

Schedule

References

Penn
Penn Quakers football seasons
Penn Quakers football